RiksTV (formerly NTV Pluss) is the distributor of pay television in the Norwegian digital terrestrial television network.

Except for NRK1, NRK2, NRK3/NRK Super and the NRK radio channels, all broadcasts in the Norwegian DTT network are encrypted. The channels that are broadcast in the RiksTV packages are selected by RiksTV themselves.

History

Pre-launch
Some of the initial discussions concerned the availability of free-to-air channels other than the ones from NRK. TV 2 and TVNorge had stated that their channels would be encrypted, although they were free-to-air in the analogue network. This caused Modern Times Group, owners of TV3, to announce the launch of "TV4" that they wanted to be free-to-air. RiksTV were however unwilling to broadcast it free-to-air.

The first channels were announced on 12 June 2007, and were TV 2, TVNorge, TV3, TV 2 Zebra, Discovery Channel, Disney Channel, The Voice TV, SportN, TV 2 Filmkanalen, TV 2 Nyhetskanalen, Viasat 4, TVNorge2 (was named FEM the next day), Canal+ Sport 1 and Canal+ Film 1. The radio channels P4, Kanal 24 and Radio 1 were also included.

On 12 June, it was announced that Animal Planet, Canal+ Film 2, the National Geographic Channel, TV 2 Sport and local television would launch later on. It was however announced in July that BBC World would become a part of the RiksTV package and that Animal Planet, Canal+ Film 2 and National Geographic would be a part of the package from the start, thanks to new compression technology.

Among the rejected channels were MTV, Eurosport, SVT1 and SVT2 (these two due to rights issues). The fact that MTV was rejected, meant that The Voice TV would be the only music channel on RiksTV. International news channels such as CNN, BBC World and Sky News were also rejected initially, as TV2 Nyhetskanalen first was seen as good enough.

Launch
RiksTV started its launch on 1 September 2007, in Rogaland County. The lineup from the launch was:

RiksTV was then launched in the remaining counties in this order:
4 September 2007: Østfold
6 September 2007: Oslo and Akershus
1 October 2007: Hordaland
8 October 2007: Møre og Romsdal
11 October 2007: Buskerud, Vestfold and Telemark
1 November 2007: Sør-Trøndelag
5 November 2007: Sogn og Fjordane
8 November 2007: Hedmark and Oppland
November 2008: Aust-Agder, Vest-Agder, Nord-Trøndelag, Nordland, Troms and Finnmark

Post-launch 
On 25 June 2009, TV 2 upgraded their signal and started broadcasting the entire channel in high-definition.

SportN closed down on 15 September 2009. Its channel space was left empty for two months until 15 November, when it was replaced by Eurosport.

On 10 September 2010, RiksTV announced the first major expansion of its channel lineup with six new channels. The new channels were the Swedish public service channels SVT1 and SVT2, the Children's channels Playhouse Disney and Disney XD, the lifestyle channel TLC and the new men's channel MAX. TVNorge will also started broadcasting in high-definition. The new channels launched on 14 September, with the exception MAX which starts on 1 November. On 1 November 2012, SVT2 was replaced by BBC Entertainment.

Today 
RiksTV has a monopoly in Norwegian terrestrial pay-TV and its services include the following packages and channels:

Television channels

Radio channels

On-demand

See also
 Norges Televisjon – Operator of the digital terrestrial television network in Norway

References

External links 
 Official site

Television broadcasting companies of Norway
Companies based in Oslo
Companies established in 2005
Pay television
NRK
Telenor
TV 2 (Norway)